Hoseynabad (also Romanized as Ḩoseynābād) is a village in Gowdin Rural District, in the Central District of Kangavar County, Kermanshah Province, Iran. At the 2006 census, its population was 553, in 120 families.

References 

Populated places in Kangavar County